Neal Nitz (March 23, 1954 – April 13, 2015) was a farmer and politician.

Political career
Nitz was a Republican member of the Michigan House of Representatives from 2003 through 2008. Both prior to and following his service in the House, he was a member of the Berrien County Board of Commissioners.

Background
Born in Benton Harbor, Michigan, Nitz went to Southwestern Michigan College. A third-generation farmer, Nitz was the owner of Neal Nitz Farms. He was also a member of the Southwestern Michigan Tourist Council and the county planning commission, and a former president of the Baroda Lions Club.

References

1954 births
2015 deaths
People from Benton Harbor, Michigan
Farmers from Michigan
County commissioners in Michigan
Republican Party members of the Michigan House of Representatives